George Clayton Huff, Jr. (born November 4, 1980) is an American singer. He placed first among male contestants and overall fifth-place finalist on the third season of the reality/talent-search television series American Idol.

Biography
Huff is originally from New Orleans, Louisiana. Huff auditioned for the third season of American Idol in Houston, Texas; he was a member of the fourth group of semi-finalists. He was actually not among those originally chosen for the semi-final round, but was put through when contestant Donnie Williams was disqualified for a drunk driving arrest.

American Idol
Huff was not voted through to the final round from his group of semi-finalists, but got another second chance when he was brought back for the wildcard round and put through as a finalist by contest judge Simon Cowell. During this period, New Orleans Fox Affiliate WVUE would hold specials including Huff's family cheering George on during the latest episodes.

On May 5, 2004, Huff was voted off in fifth place after two renditions of Fred Astaire's "Cheek to Cheek" and Louis Armstrong's "What a Wonderful World" during big band week.

American Idol performances

After Idol
His album, Miracles, was released by Word Records, on October 11, 2005. The first single off that album was "Brighter Day". It sold 18,000 copies.

In 2005, his Louisiana home was affected by Hurricane Katrina. He left New Orleans and stayed at his brother's house in Dallas. His recent performances have included an October 2006 concert at West Virginia University and a December 2006 Christmas show in Salinas, California. He also had a recent brief performance at New York's Dr. Susan S. Mckinney Secondary School for the Arts on November 10, 2008.

In 2007 Huff's song "Brighter Day" was briefly featured in Tyler Perry's movie "Why Did I Get Married?" starring Janet Jackson.

On April 7, 2009 George Huff released his self-titled sophomore effort, featuring the songs "I Belong To You(Yours)", "Victory", "Free", "Destiny" (featuring Coko of SWV and Tasha Collins from the first season of BET's Sunday Best) and the lead single "Don't Let Go".

On March 24, 2011, Huff performed as a back-up singer to longtime friend and fellow Idol alum Jennifer Hudson during the third week of finals on the tenth season of American Idol, where she performed her current album's lead single, "Where You At." Huff has been singing background vocals for many of Hudson's live performances since then, and works as her vocal arranger for live performances.

Discography

Albums

Singles
Go Tell It on the Mountain
Brighter Day
Miracles
You Know Me (Number 32 Hot Gospel Songs)
Don't Let Go

Notes

External links
George Huff American Idol profile

Living people
1980 births
American Idol participants
Musicians from New Orleans
American performers of Christian music
Singers from Louisiana
21st-century African-American male singers